Lost Ollie is an American live action/computer animated miniseries created by Shannon Tindle. The series is based on the 2016 children's book Ollie's Odyssey by William Joyce. 

Lost Ollie was released on August 24, 2022, by Netflix.

Synopsis
A lost rabbit toy, Ollie, finds himself at lost and found section at an antique shop. He remembered that he was separated from his best friend, Billy. Having only a few recollections of his past, Ollie decides to take a journey to find Billy. Meanwhile, he slowly rediscovers his own fond memories with Billy and his adopted family alongside their misfortunes and sorrows.

Cast

Voice cast
 Jonathan Groff as Ollie
 Mary J. Blige as Rosy
 Tim Blake Nelson as Zozo

Live-action cast
 Gina Rodriguez as Momma
 Jake Johnson as Daddy
 Kesler Talbot as Billy 
 William Carson as young Billy
 BJ Harrison as Flossie
 Everett Andres as Mike Apple
 Zoë Noelle Baker as Jolene
 Isabel Birch as Suzy
 James Pizzinato as Suzy's dad/Older Billy

Episodes

Production

Development 
On October 6, 2020, Netflix director Teddy Biaselli revealed that Lost Ollie had been picked up by the streaming platform, mentioning that the series had been in the works since 2016.

Casting 
On March 9, 2021, Jonathan Groff was cast in the title role, with Mary J. Blige, Tim Blake Nelson, Gina Rodriguez, Jake Johnson, and Kesler Talbot also joining the series and production beginning in Vancouver.

Filming 
Principal photography for the series began on February 1, 2021, with filming taking place inside and outside College Park Elementary from February 9 to February 11 in Port Moody. According to Production Weekly, filming concluded in March 2021.

Release 
The series was released on August 24, 2022.

Reception 
The series overall was received positively. 

Rendy Jones of RogerEbert.com gave the series 3.5/4 stars praising its visuals, writing, and characterization. He emphasized the "breathtaking" visuals on the series as well as the dark and sentimental approach to the formula. Stephanie Snyder of Common Sense Media gave the series 4/5 stars praising its cinematography and storytelling while criticizing its "inauthentic" Southern accent of the characters. Joel Keller of Decider similarly praised its visuals provided by the effects team of ILM while criticizing the characters' "unnatural" accent.

References

External links
 
 

2022 American television series debuts
2022 American television series endings
2020s American television miniseries
American television shows based on children's books
American television series with live action and animation
English-language Netflix original programming
Netflix children's programming
Television series based on children's books
Television shows filmed in Vancouver